Gughod (or Gugodh) is a village in Rewari mandal of Nahar Block of Kosli Subdivision , Rewari district, Haryana, India.

Demographics
As of 2011 India census, Gughod had a population of 2431 in 492 households. Males (1275) constitute 52.44%  of the population and females (1156) 47.55%. Gughod has an average literacy (1673) rate of 68.81%, lower than the national average of 74%: male literacy (1007) is 60.19%, and female literacy (666) is 39.8%. In Gughod, 12.91% of the population is under 6 years of age (314).

References

Villages in Rewari district